Duras is a commune in the Lot-et-Garonne department in south-western France.

The town is traversed by the Dropt river.

Notable people
David Hume of Godscroft (1558-1629), Scottish historian and philosopher, was the pastor in Duras 1604–1614.
The writer Marguerite Donnadieu (1914–1996) took the pseudonym "Marguerite Duras" in 1943, after this village, where her father's house was located.

Sister cities
Duras is twinned with the following cities:

  Sint-Truiden, Belgium

See also

Communes of the Lot-et-Garonne department

References

Communes of Lot-et-Garonne
Agenais